A Different Story is the debut album from Brazilian singer Deborah Blando. Launched in 1991, the album was produced entirely in English language.

Background
The story before the production begins in 1989, when Deborah met singer Cyndi Lauper on tour in Rio de Janeiro and she decides to introduce her to her manager David Wolff, affiliated with Epic Records. Then, David introduced Deborah to Sony Music executives and she signs a contract to produce an album in Portuguese language. However, the record company decides to invest in a possible international career and it brings together a songwriting team committee to translating her songs previously ready in Portuguese to English, as "Innocence" and "Shame". In less than three months Deborah moved to New York and signs a contract with Sony International and North American Sony.

As a commercial theme for a campaign for Coca-Cola (Diet Coke) in the summer of 1991, the song "Boy (Why You Wanna Make Me Blue)", produced by ET Thorngren, debuted as the first single from the album in the Top 10 the American Dance Chart months earlier. It is a eurodance remake for "Girl (Why You Wanna Make Me Blue)", originally composed by the American duo Eddie Holland and Norman Whitfield for The Temptations, in 1964.

"Decadence Avec Elegance" came from the great success from Brazilian singer Lobão who had recorded five years earlier. Translated to English, Deborah's version has gathered pace and innovated as in the previous song, more focused on rock music. Music video was recorded in Olinda, with scenes of a live show held on the beach of Boa Viagem for an audience of over 80,000 people during the tour conducted by the Brazilian northeast states.

"Innocence" was composed by Deborah at her apartment in Rio de Janeiro originally in Portuguese and translated to English by Kit Hain, Larry Dvoskin and ET Thorngren – team organized by David Wolff, who hired the consecrated duo Billy Steinberg and Tom Kelly, responsible for several hits by Cyndi Lauper in the 80s as "True Colors" and "I Drove All Night." According to the Billboard magazine, the song spent 13 weeks at number one in Brazil.

Re-release
Produced by David Wolff, the special edition of the album was aimed at reaching the Brazilian public with the promotion of some tracks exclusively recorded in Portuguese, after Deborah's debut on the world market. There are "A Maçã", former success of singer Raul Seixas from the album Novo Aeon (1975), and a new version of the song "Innocence", which presents the second verse in Portuguese. "Decadence Avec Elegance" also earned a second version with better-worked vocals.

Track listing

References

1991 debut albums
Deborah Blando albums
Epic Records albums